General elections were held in Lesotho on 28 February 2015 for all 120 seats of the National Assembly, the lower house of the Parliament of Lesotho, more than two years ahead of schedule due to the 2014 political crisis. Following mediation facilitated by the Southern African Development Community (SADC), King Letsie III on the advice of the incumbent Prime Minister Tom Thabane, dissolved the Eighth Parliament and called a snap election.

Lesotho uses the mixed-member proportional representation voting system. More than 1.2 million voters had been registered by the Independent Electoral Commission. The army was confined to the barracks on the election day. The opposition Democratic Congress managed to form a coalition government as no party achieved an outright majority. Voter turnout was 48%.

Background

After the 2012 election, Prime Minister Pakalitha Mosisili's Democratic Congress failed to attain a majority; and thus a coalition government was formed among the three opposition parties: All Basotho Convention (ABC), Lesotho Congress for Democracy (LCD) and the Basotho National Party (BCP). The government was led by ABC's Tom Thabane, who served as the new Prime Minister; whilst the leader of LCD, Mothetjoa Metsing was appointed as the Deputy Prime Minister.

Following political tensions and the suspension of the National Assembly over the controversial change of the head of the army from Lieutenant General Kennedy Tlali Kamoli to Lieutenant General Maaparankoe Mahao, an attempted coup d'état  forced Prime Minister Tom Thabane to flee the country. He then returned under cover of South African and Namibian police, who guarded him around-the-clock. Under the auspices of the SADC, mediation led by South African Deputy President Cyril Ramaphosa resulted in a call for an early election. The national elections took place on 28 February. Thabane was backed by the national police, while his deputy Mothetjoa Metsing was backed by the army, which refused to recognise the change in army leadership.

On 17 October, the National Assembly reconvened in a bid to avert the political crisis, with Thabane's advisor Tumisang Mosotho saying "It’s a milestone. We want to hope this is the first step in the right direction, in liberating our country from the danger that has surrounded us these past few months". Senate Chief Whip Khoabane Theko said: "This is what we can call maybe the beginning of the process that takes us to the elections, because we are going to have a budget and maybe deliberate other laws... ahead of our elections from here on".

Electoral system
The 120 members of the National Assembly are elected in two groups; 80 are elected in single-member constituencies by first-past-the-post voting, with 40 elected by proportional representation in a  single nationwide constituency. Voters cast one vote and the 40 proportional seats are allocated in a compensatory system, in order to reflect the number of votes received by each party, making it a variant of the mixed-member proportional electoral system.

Campaign
Thabane said that he would run again seeking a new mandate after signing the Maseru Facilitation Declaration.

Results
Election observer missions were deployed to the kingdom from the African Union, the Commonwealth of Nations and SADC; and were led by former Kenyan Prime Minister Raila Odinga, former Botswana President Festus Mogae and South African International Relations Minister Maite Nkoana-Mashabane respectively.

UN Secretary-General Ban Ki-moon congratulated the citizens for conducting a peaceful election. The SADC Election Observer Mission concluded that the elections were "peaceful, transparent, credible, free and fair."

The Democratic Congress formed a coalition government with the Lesotho Congress for Democracy and five other smaller parties as no party achieved an outright majority. Pakalitha Mosisili took over as Prime Minister whilst incumbent Deputy Prime Minister Mothetjoa Metsing retained his position.

By district

References

External links
IEC Lesotho

Lesotho
Elections in Lesotho
General
Lesotho